Doug Williams (born June 25, 1969) is an American comedian from Montgomery, Alabama.

Early life and education 
Williams was born in Montgomery, Alabama. He began performing stand-up comedy in 1990, five years before graduating from Alabama State University in 1995.

Career 
After college, Williams moved to Los Angeles where he landed small roles in the 1996 remake of The Nutty Professor and First Kid. Since then, he has had guest roles on many sitcoms, including The Bernie Mac Show.

Doug Williams has served as host and executive producer of "Martin Lawrence Presents 1st Amendment Stand-up" for the past four seasons.

Williams voiced plans to co-write his own TV sitcom titled Domestic Doug. The show centered around protagonist "Doug Salter", a stand-up comedian trying to make it in Hollywood, not unlike Williams himself. The project never came to fruition.

Emmitt Smith roast 
Doug Williams gained internet notoriety in the mid-2000s when a clip of him at a 2001 roasting of Emmitt Smith surfaced on the internet. Jamie Foxx, who hosted the event, continuously interrupted Williams' performance, speaking into his own microphone and making sarcastic remarks, acting as Williams's conscience; "Maybe I should say something nice about Emmitt and... wrap it up", "or maybe I should say something about how black people have to struggle. Yeah, that'll get em on my side."

In February 2010, Williams spoke about the incident in an interview with LAist: "I think a lot of people read more into it than it was. It was a roast, I'm not a roast-type of comedian. The situation just kind of caught me off-guard. I was new at the time. I was new to that environment. I was new to roasting. It's one of those things that happened and I'm better for it. It was a long time ago, I've learned a lot since then and I've come a long way since then." He added, "At that time, Jamie Foxx was an established well known comedian. Nobody knew who I was. It was a situation where no matter what happened, I wasn't going to get the best of him in that setting."

Filmography

Film

Television

References

External links 
 
 www.dougwilliams.net – official site
 comedycentral.com – stand-up comedy clips

Living people
American stand-up comedians
African-American male comedians
American male comedians
21st-century American comedians
Writers from Montgomery, Alabama
Male actors from Montgomery, Alabama
21st-century African-American people
1969 births